LFIA may refer to:
 Lycée Français International d'Anvers
 Lycée Français International Jacques Prévert d'Accra